Fulgenzio Vitman (1728–1806) was an Italian clergyman and botanist. In 1774, he developed the Brera Botanical Garden in Milan out of a former Jesuit garden, under the direction of Maria Theresa of Austria.

Publications
Summa Plantarum volume 1 (1789)
Summa Plantarum volume 2 (1789)
Summa Plantarum volume 3 (1789)
Summa Plantarum volume 4 (1790)
Summa Plantarum volume 5 (1791)
Summa Plantarum volume 6 (1792)

References

1728 births
1806 deaths
Botanists with author abbreviations
18th-century Italian botanists